D'Amours is a surname. Notable people with the surname include:

Jacques D'Amours (born 1956/57), Canadian billionaire businessman
Jean-Claude D'Amours (born 1972), Canadian politician
Norman D'Amours (born 1937), member of the United States House of Representatives from New Hampshire

See also
 Amour (disambiguation)
 D'Amour (surname)